Peristeria may refer to:

 Peristeria (plant), a genus of orchids
 Peristeria, Drama, a village in the Drama regional unit, Greece
 Peristeria (volcano), one of the volcanoes of the Santorini complex